Dark Skies is an American UFO conspiracy theory-based sci-fi television series that debuted on NBC on September 21, 1996, and ended on May 31, 1997, and was later rerun by the Sci-Fi Channel; 18 episodes and a two-hour pilot episode were broadcast as a part of NBC's short-lived Thrillogy block. The success of The X-Files on Fox resulted in NBC commissioning this proposed competitor following a pitch from producers Bryce Zabel and Brent Friedman. Its tagline was "History as we know it is a lie."

Series overview
The series presents the idea that 20th-century history as people know it is a lie. It depicts aliens having been among humans since the late 1940s, with a government cover-up concealing their existence from the public. As the series progresses, viewers follow John Loengard and Kim Sayers through the 1960s as they attempt to foil the plots of the alien "Hive". The Hive is an alien race that planned to invade Earth through a manipulation of historical events and famous figures, including most notably the assassination of President John F. Kennedy. In addition, the pair must stay one step ahead of Majestic 12, a covert government agency that has mixed motives. The show depicted a number of real-life 1960s personalities in the plot, such as The Beatles, Robert F. Kennedy, Jim Morrison, and J. Edgar Hoover.

The series was cancelled before the end of the first season, due to low ratings. Although the last episode produced provides some form of closure for the series, with John Loengard meeting his son and the head of Majestic 12 being apparently assassinated, the show's creators had originally hoped to create five seasons, as indicated by the show's Bible or major planning document. According to Zabel and Friedman's original plan, the pilot and first season (given the overall title "Official Denial") would cover the period from 1961 to 1969, the second season ("Progenitor") 1970 to 1976, the third season ("Cloak of Fear") 1977 to 1986, the fourth season ("New World Order") would cover 1987 to 1999, and the fifth and final season ("Stroke of Midnight") would break from the decade-spanning format to encompass the apocalyptic final conflict against the invaders, taking place from 2000 to 2001.

The Hive
The series depicts the Hive as an alien species who are covertly invading Earth. They are a parasitic race of small multilegged, spider-like beings that can take control of host bodies, by attaching themselves to the brain. They do this by entering through orifices on the head, commonly the mouth, though they are also shown to enter by squeezing through the nose and ears, with great discomfort to the host. Due to the way they attach themselves to the brain's ganglion regions, the series' protagonists dub the creatures "Ganglions".

Various stages from Alpha to Delta occur that show varying degrees of the infection. Initial symptoms of take-over include drastic mood swings, behavioral abnormalities, and nervous breakdowns, as the parasite adjusts to taking control of the person's mind. Past medical records of a nervous breakdown are a tell-tale sign that someone may have been taken over.  The Gamma and Delta stages are where the Hive organism takes total control over the host, which becomes nothing more than a shell for the invading organism.

Not all humans make acceptable hosts for the Ganglions. Due to certain genetic factors, a few humans are incompatible with the Ganglions' biology; these have been dubbed "Throwbacks". Several cases occur where a group of people were abducted and taken over by Ganglion parasites, but a Throwback in the group was not infected and simply returned, often because killing them would be too conspicuous. Captured Ganglion parasites have been injected with the blood of Throwbacks, causing them to die in agony. The Hive is running various experiments to try to either eliminate Throwbacks or develop more humans who are easier to control, such as growing cloned human babies in cows.

Some time ago, the Ganglions invaded an advanced alien race, dubbed the "Greys"—the typical depiction of a Roswell Grey alien. The Greys were a race not unlike humans, though they possessed technology making them capable of interstellar travel. The Ganglion parasites invaded them in much the same way that they are trying to invade Earth now, and by the time they realized what was happening, it was too late. Thus, the "Grey aliens" seen abducting humans are really just as much a slave race or "shells" for the Ganglions as the infected humans are.

The Hive's language, Thhtmaa, was developed by University of California, Los Angeles, graduate student Matt Pearson. Pearson went on to become a professor of linguistics at Reed College.

When the Ganglions were evolving, apparently before they took over other animals as hosts, they had a natural predator — slug-like creatures called "buzz worms". They have actually brought samples of the buzz worms along with them with their ships, using them as a particularly gruesome means of executing their own kind.

Cast

Main
 Eric Close as John Loengard
 Megan Ward as Kimberly Sayers
 J. T. Walsh as Frank Bach
 Tim Kelleher as Jim Steele
 Conor O'Farrell as Phil Albano
 Charley Lang as Dr. Halligan
 Jeri Ryan as Juliet Stuart

Notable guests, based on real-life 1960s figures

 Art Bell as William Paley
 Arell Blanton as General Nathan Farragut Twining
 Wolfgang Bodison as Colin Powell
 Robert Carradine as Lonnie Zamora
Bryan Clark as President Ronald Reagan
 Dennis Creaghan as J. Lee Rankin
 Carey Eidel as Brian Epstein
 Richard Fancy as James Forrestal
 Brent David Fraser as Jim Morrison
 Richard Gilliland as Jesse Marcel
 Paul Gleason as Governor Nelson Rockefeller
 Susan Griffiths as Marilyn Monroe
 Carmine Grippo as Ringo Starr
 Jerome Patrick Hoban as Ed Sullivan
 Gunther Jenson as Captain Norman Schwarzkopf
 James F. Kelly as Robert Kennedy
 Mike Kennedy as Allen Dulles
 James Lancaster as Kenneth Parkinson
 Jack Lindine as Jack Ruby
 Gary Lockwood as Chief Justice Earl Warren
 Tim Michael McDougall as Paul McCartney
 Marilyn McIntyre as Dorothy Kilgallen
 Don Moss as Senator Hubert Humphrey
 Don Most as Dr. Timothy Leary
 Rick Anthony Pizaria as George Harrison
 Hansford Rowe as President Harry S. Truman
 Leon Russom as Admiral Roscoe H. Hillenkoetter
 Mitchell Ryan as William S. Paley
 Joe Stefanelli as John Lennon
 Wayne Tippit as J. Edgar Hoover
 Joe Urla as Dr. Carl Sagan
 Peter Van Norden as Henry Kissinger
 Sam Whipple as J. Allen Hynek

Episodes

Note: The episode "Inhuman Nature" was shown out of chronological order and should come after "Ancient Future". The episode "White Rabbit" opens up with the Gulf of Tonkin incident on August 2, 1964 but it is a few weeks later after John visits his family and testifies to the Warren Commission when the rest of the episode takes place.

Home media release
Following fan campaigns for many years, an announcement was made that Dark Skies would receive a complete series DVD box set release in October 2007 (presumably for Region 1). However, Sony Entertainment subsequently canceled the release, citing prohibitive music licensing costs.

Executive producers Bryce Zabel and Brent Friedman received permission from Sony to find a DVD releasing partner to put the series on the market. However, three independent DVD firms, while initially extremely enthusiastic about doing so, also backed away after discovering the potential costs involved in licensing the period music. Zabel told fans on his blog:

It doesn't mean the idea is dead but it does mean it's not going to be easy. I'm as committed as I've ever been to seeing the series released on DVD so that old fans and new fans can have an excellent quality viewing experience, the way we always intended. Or maybe the conspiracy we wrote about is real and they just don't want the truth to get out...

On January 11, 2009, Zabel reported that "Brent and I aren't ready to say that's the end of it, but it's the end of the beginning. We're probably more disappointed than any fan out there."

Region 2 distribution rights were acquired by Mediumrare, with the full series being released on DVD in the United Kingdom on October 18, 2010.

On the August 9, 2010, episode of Coast to Coast AM, Zabel announced that the series would be released on Region 1 DVD by Shout! Factory on January 20, 2011. The series was successfully released in the US on six DVDs, including a number of special features (an hour-long "making of" documentary, and the never-before-seen pitch for the second season, among others) on the last disc.

The pilot episode was included in the last DVD as an extra.

CD soundtrack
To celebrate the show's tenth anniversary, a limited edition CD soundtrack was released on Perseverance Records in September 2006, featuring selections from the original television score composed by Michael Hoenig and a previously unreleased Pilot Suite arranged by The X-Files composer Mark Snow.

Awards and nominations

See also
 The Invaders tv series
 The X Files tv series

References

External links
 

1990s American science fiction television series
1996 American television series debuts
1997 American television series endings
English-language television shows
NBC original programming
Television series by Sony Pictures Television
UFO-related television
JFK-UFO conspiracy theories
Television series set in 1960
Television series set in 1961
Television series set in 1962
Television series set in 1963
Television series set in 1964
Television series set in 1965
Television series set in 1966
Television series set in 1967
Roswell incident in fiction
Television shows about the assassination of John F. Kennedy